is a Japanese film actress who portrayed the pale  Sadako Yamamura in Ring & Ring 2.

External links

1967 births
Living people
Japanese film actresses
Actresses from Tokyo
Date of birth missing (living people)